The 2021–22 Ole Miss Rebels men's basketball team represented the University of Mississippi in the 2021–22 NCAA Division I men's basketball season. The Rebels were led by fourth-year head coach, Kermit Davis. The Rebels played their home games at The Sandy and John Black Pavilion at Ole Miss in Oxford, Mississippi as members of the Southeastern Conference.

Previous season
The Rebels finished the 2020–21 season 16–12, 10–8 in SEC play to finish in sixth place. They lost in the first round of the NIT to Louisiana Tech.

Offseason

Departures

2021 recruiting class

Incoming transfers

Roster

Schedule

|-
!colspan=12 style=|Exhibition

|-
!colspan=12 style=|Non-conference regular season

|-
!colspan=12 style=|SEC regular season

|-
!colspan=12 style=| SEC tournament

Schedule source:

See also
2021–22 Ole Miss Rebels women's basketball team

References 

Ole Miss
Ole Miss Rebels men's basketball seasons
Ole Miss Rebels men's basketball
Ole Miss Rebels men's basketball